Prodiaphania is a genus of parasitic flies in the family Tachinidae..

Species

Prodiaphania arida Paramonov, 1968
Prodiaphania biarmata (Malloch, 1936)
Prodiaphania brevitarsis Paramonov, 1968
Prodiaphania claripennis Malloch, 1929
Prodiaphania commoni Paramonov, 1968
Prodiaphania cygnus (Malloch, 1936)
Prodiaphania deserta Paramonov, 1968
Prodiaphania echinomides (Bigot, 1874)
Prodiaphania fullerae Paramonov, 1968
Prodiaphania funebris Paramonov, 1968
Prodiaphania furcata (Malloch, 1936)
Prodiaphania genitalis Paramonov, 1968
Prodiaphania georgei Malloch, 1929
Prodiaphania minuta Paramonov, 1968
Prodiaphania regina (Malloch, 1936)
Prodiaphania victoriae (Malloch, 1936)
Prodiaphania walkeri Paramonov, 1968

References

Diptera of Australasia
Tachinidae genera
Dexiinae
Taxa named by Charles Henry Tyler Townsend